Cimarrón is a Colombian musical group of festive dance music joropo from the plains of the Orinoco River. This Grammy nominated band makes latin music with its Andalusian, Indigenous American native and African roots. Their music includes four-stringed cuatro, harp, maracas, and also peruvian-flamenco cajón, brazilian surdo, afro-colombian tambora, a stomp dance as a percussion component and tribal indigenous whistles.

History 
Singer Ana Veydó and harpist Carlos "Cuco" Rojas founded Cimarron in Colombia. Rojas was part of a delegation of Colombian musicians that played for the Colombian writer Gabriel García Márquez during the awarding of Nobel Prize in Literature 1982 on Stockholm, Sweden.

Cimarron started to internationalize their work in folk and world music festivals like Smithsonian Folklife Festival, WOMEX Festival, WOMAD, LEAF Festival, Newport Folk Festival, China National Center for the Performing Arts, Rainforest World Music Festival, Paléo Festival, Glatt & Verkehrt, Festival Músicas do Mundo, Festival Rio Loco, Festival Mawazine, Rajasthan International Folk Festival, Førde International Folk Music Festival, Sfinks Mixed, Flamenco Biennale Nederland, Lotus World Music & Arts Festival, National Cowboy Poetry Gathering, Utah Arts Festival, San Francisco International Arts Festival, Globalquerque, Festival International de Lousiane, Festival Nuit du Suds, Zomer van Antwerpen, Abu Dhabi Culture & Heritage, Festival México Centro Histórico and other scenarios around Europe, United States, Asia, America and Middle East.

Their 2004 album, Sí soy llanero (Smithsonian Folkways Recordings), was a Best Traditional World Music Album Nominee on 47th Annual Grammy Awards. They are nominated for Latin Grammy 2019 for Best Folk Album with their new release Orinoco.

On 2007, Cimarron worked on a live album with Official Harpist to the Prince of Wales, Catrin Finch, and also they toured all over United Kingdom.

Smithsonian Folkways Recordings also released Cimarron's 2011 album, ¡Cimarrón! Joropo Music from the plains of Colombia. In those years, Cimarron presented their Orinoco performance. They were Best Latin Album winner on 2012 Independent Music Awards and Best Traditional Music Show nominee on 2014 Premios Lunas del Auditorio de Mexico.

Cimarron has performed on United States, Spain, Portugal, France, Belgium, Netherlands, Switzerland, Norway, England, Czech Republic, Austria, Slovenia, Scotland, Croatia, Wales, Morocco, Arab Emirates, India, China, Japan, Malaysia, Rajasthan, Lebanon, Algeria, Mexico, Nicaragua, Guatemala, Costa Rica, El Salvador, República Dominicana, Panama, Colombia, Ecuador, Argentina, Chile y Uruguay.

Discography

Awards and nominations

Featurings 
Cimarron have some guest appearances in other Colombian music records from artists such as Aterciopelados, Carlos Vives and Magín Díaz.

In 1996, the band was guest by Aterciopelados to play the harp and cuatro for their song La culpable, written by Andrea Echeverri and Héctor Buitrago, and included in the album La Pipa de la Paz. This album was Grammy nominated for Best Latin/Alternative Album.

Cimarron also played the music for the song Dios y el alma in children's album Pombo musical, produced in 2008 by Carlos Vives. This record, winner of the Latin Grammy for Best Children's Album, includes another guest appearances from Colombian artists such as Juanes, Cabas and Fonseca.

Recently, Cimarron performed a song with Colombian popular musician Magín Díaz on 2017 album El Orisha de la Rosa, which was the winner of a Latin Grammy for Best Packaging Design.

References 

Musical groups from Bogotá
Musical groups established in 1986
World music groups
1986 establishments in Colombia